Ján Figeľ (born 20 January 1960 in Čaklov) is a Slovak politician.
Figeľ served as European Commissioner from 2004 to 2009, then as Slovak minister of Transports from 2010 to 2012. 
From 2016 to 2019 he was European Commission special envoy for the promotion of freedom of religion outside the EU.

Biography 
Born in Čaklov, Figeľ studied power electronics at the Technical University of Košice for five years, beginning in 1978. During his studies, he was Faculty chairman of the Socialist Youth Union, a youth Marxist–Leninist organization of the Communist Party of Czechoslovakia. From 1983 he worked as a research and development scientist for ZPA Prešov. He joined the conservative Christian Democratic Movement (KDH) in 1990 and was elected to the National Council of the Slovak Republic in 1992, serving on its Foreign Affairs Committee and becoming a member of Slovakia's delegation to the Council of Europe a year later.

In 1998 Figeľ left his parliamentary seat and was appointed State Secretary of the Ministry of Foreign Affairs. Unlike most of his colleagues in the European Commission, he never rose to a cabinet-level position, but led Slovakia's accession negotiations with the European Union until 2003. He also represented the Slovak government in the European Convention which drafted the European Constitution. He returned to the National Council in 2002 where he chaired its Foreign Affairs Committee, stepping down in 2004 to take up his Commission post.

From 1995 to 2000 Figeľ lectured in international relations at Trnava University. He is married with four children.

European Commissioner 
Figeľ served briefly in the Prodi Commission. From Slovakia's accession to the European Union on 1 May 2004 to the confirmation of the Barroso Commission later that year he jointly held the Enterprise and Information Society portfolio, sharing his role for most of that period with the Finnish appointee Olli Rehn, also new to the job. The Slovak government nominated Figeľ for the incoming Barroso Commission which took office on 22 November 2004. His appointment to the Education, Training, Culture and Multilingualism portfolio was regarded as something of a disappointment. Figeľ himself said that the role was not his "primary choice", but he accepted it "as a challenge".
Questioned by the European Parliament, Figeľ said that the goal of a true European labour market would require more investment in education, professional training, mobility, and simpler Europe-wide acknowledgment of qualifications. He said that the promotion of education was vital to the aims set out in the Lisbon Strategy.
He told MEPs that he would like all children in the EU to be taught at least two foreign languages at school, and also stressed his support for UNESCO.
From 1 January 2007, in the enlarged Barroso Commission after the accession of Bulgaria and Romania to the European Union, responsibility for multilingualism was transferred to Commissioner for Multilingualism, Romanian Leonard Orban.
Figeľ announced his resignation from the commission on 21 September 2009, following his election as the leader of Christian Democratic Movement in Slovakia. He was replaced by Maroš Šefčovič on 1 October 2009.

Figeľ received a PhD title in the field of social work at St Elizabeth's School of Medicine and Social Work in Bratislava, a university-level private academic institution, in 2007. The majority of the thesis was copied from a publication he edited in 2003 with Slovak diplomat Miroslav Adamiš, "Slovakia on the Road to the European Union – Chapters and Contexts", in which they described the country's EU accession process. The rector of St Elizabeth's School, Vladimír Krčméry, said that they took into consideration Figeľ's position and had granted Figeľ a PhD mainly due to the fact that he was at the time serving as a European commissioner.
On 24 August 2012 Science Insider reported that he "is facing an official inquiry into the legitimacy of his PhD, awarded while he was in office."

Slovak Minister of Transports 
From 2010 to 2012 Figeľ was a Slovak Deputy Prime Minister and Minister for Transport, Construction and Regional Development.

Figeľ was chairman of the Christian Democratic Movement (KDH) from 19 September 2009 until 15 March 2016, when he resigned as party leader following unsuccessful general elections when KDH took just 4.96 percent of the vote and, as a result, Christian Democrats did not win any seats in the parliament for the first time since they were established in 1990 and paid the price for not passing the baton to a new generation. Furthermore, Figeľ created a controversy with an electoral campaign focusing on anti immigration and nationalist rhetoric with a slogan about "white Slovakia". In May 2019, he ran for European Parliament elections but, receiving only 23792 preferential votes, he was not elected.

In autumn 2010, Slovak media raised controversy regarding Figeľ's generous EU perks making him a politician with best revenues in Slovakia. Furthermore, Slovak daily newspaper SME recalled that in 2001, when his party colleague Andrej Ďurkovský was Bratislava's Old City district Mayor, Figeľ obtained a social housing apartment in downtown Bratislava for almost nothing (156 sq meters for 1.813 €). Figeľ has defended this transaction as legal and justified by his service to the country as EU Chief Negotiator and his family needs. Nevertheless, these allegations pushed Figeľ to declare his intention to offer his apartment to a charity endowment. Slovak Prime Minister Iveta Radičová said that if Figeľ had taken any different course of action it would have harmed the whole ruling coalition, since she could have not used the justification employed by her predecessor Robert Fico who dismissed scandals connected to his coalition partners by saying that they were their own business.

Special Envoy for the promotion of freedom of religion or belief outside the European Union 
Following unsuccessful general elections in Slovakia in March 2016, Figeľ resigned as chairman of the Christian Democratic Movement (KDH), and was then appointed Special Envoy for the promotion of freedom of religion or belief outside the European Union by European Commission President Jean-Claude Juncker on 6 May 2016.
The European Parliament supported and had called for this initiative in its Resolution of 4 February 2016. During his mandate, Figeľ reported to the European Commission Vice-President Frans Timmermans who was then responsible for the dialogue with churches and faith-based organisation (Art.17 TFEU). He served in this position as Special Adviser to the Commissioner for International Cooperation and Development, Neven Mimica. His mandate expired with the end of term of Juncker Commission on 30 November 2019. No such special envoy was appointed in the Von der Leyen Commission.

In January 2018, during his visit to Pakistan, Figeľ's claim that the Asia Bibi case is directly linked to the outcome of negotiations and renewal of an EU-Pakistan preferential tariffs agreement GSP+ raised controversy, as it was later demonstrated as a false claim. Even though Figeľ later deleted his views on the topic published in February 2018 on his personal blog, his claim, which was not aligned to the official position of the EU, raised many concerns among Pakistani Christian community. The British Pakistani Christian Association (BPCA) Chairman Wilson Chowdhry said during a seminar in the European Parliament on 11 April 2018 that  "[the BPCA] is embarrassed that it ever believed Jan Figel, special envoy for the promotion of freedom of religion or belief outside the EU, who told the Pakistani government that the outcome of Bibi's case is going to be directly linked to trade favors the EU bestows upon Pakistan.". Furthermore, Figeľ final report on his activities contained several inaccuracies and diplomatic mistakes

In 2020, several MEPs reiterated in a public letter to new Commissioner for International Partnerships Jutta Urpilainen their concerns about the conduct of Figeľ as special envoy, in particularly his "association with religious-extremist organisations from the fringes of Christianity, which actively pursue an anti-choice agenda, targeting in particular LGBTI and women's rights around the world." The same MEPs said they had lodged a complaint with the European Ombudsman, to whom Figeľ's office had not provided information in due time. The MEPs noted that his role as Mimica's special adviser blurred the lines of accountability with the European Parliament. The MEPs also called for any future such special envoy to equally speak up for persecuted atheists and apostates.

On 30 July 2020, European Ombudsman Emily O'Reilly issued a decision on the complaint raised to her by the same MEPs. The Ombudsman noted found "surprising" that the mandate and work plan of the Special Envoy are not publicly available, noted that it is unclear how far he had the mandate to speak on behalf of the Commission and the EU, and called on the commission to provide more guidance and closer scrutiny on the work of future Special Envoys: "greater attention should have been paid to the risk from the perception of this highly sensitive post being exploited given the clashes that can emerge between freedom of religion and belief and other fundamental rights and freedoms." 
She noted that, in line with the EU's 2013 guidelines on the promotion and protection of freedom of religion or belief which reject any religion or belief-based justification for violations of human rights (such as those affecting women, members of minorities, and LGBTI persons), "It is therefore important that the Special Envoy avoid any perception of being instrumentalised by organisations that may use the promotion of freedom of religion to advance agendas that are contrary to the EU’s commitment to international human rights standards. A failure to do so also risks undermining the important work of protecting those who are persecuted around the world because of their religious or other beliefs."

References

External links
Personal blog
European Commission

|-

|-

|-

|-

|-

1960 births
20th-century Slovak people
21st-century Slovak people
Christian Democratic Movement politicians
Living people
People from Vranov nad Topľou District
People involved in plagiarism controversies
Slovak European Commissioners
Members of the National Council (Slovakia) 1992-1994
Members of the National Council (Slovakia) 1994-1998
Members of the National Council (Slovakia) 2002-2006